Count Bengt Gabrielsson Oxenstierna (1623–1702) was a Swedish soldier and statesman, who served as Foreign Minister from 1680 to 1697. During this period, he ensured Sweden remained neutral and moved away from its traditional French alliance.

Life
Bengt Gabrielsson Oxenstierna was born in Stockholm, Sweden on 16 July 1623, eldest surviving son of Gabriel Bengtsson Oxenstierna (1586–1656), and Anna Gustafsdotter Banér (1585-1656). He had eleven brothers and sisters. 

He was married twice, to Eva Juliana Wachtmeister (1639-1666), then Magdalena Stenbock (1649-1727); the two marriages produced over 20 children in all. His marriage to Eva connected Oxenstierna to Hans and Axel Wachtmeister, senior Swedish nobles who were both anti-French. 

His second wife Magdalena came from one of the leading families in Sweden; she was an intelligent and influential individual in her own right and often acted as his political colleague.

Career 

After being educated abroad, he began his diplomatic career at the discussions which led to the 1648 Peace of Westphalia that ended the Thirty Years War. During this time, he became a trusted confidant of the future Charles X of Sweden. Two years after Charles became king in 1652, Oxenstierna represented Sweden at the Kreistag of Lower Saxony. 

When the Second Northern War began in 1655, he took part in the Swedish invasion of the Polish–Lithuanian Commonwealth and became Governor of the newly-conquered Duchy of Lithuania. In July 1658, he commanded the garrison of Thorn, now Toruń when it was besieged by an Imperial-Polish force, surrendering in December; he later helped negotiate the peace of Oliva that ended the war. 

Oxenstierna generally supported closer relations between Sweden and the Holy Roman Empire, placing him in opposition to the pro-French faction headed by Magnus de la Gardie. When Charles X died in 1660, his son Charles XI of Sweden was four years old and ruled through a Regency; Oxenstierna was sidelined by de la Gardie and served as Governor-general of Livonia from 1662 to 1666. 

He recovered some of his influence when Charles XI attained his majority in 1672 and was Ambassador to Vienna, 1674 to 1676. While there, he presented a 'Memorial' or paper to Emperor Leopold titled The case of the persecuted and oppressed Protestants in some parts of Germany and Hungary, which was later published in London. During the 1675 to 1679 Scanian War, most of Swedish Pomerania was captured by Brandenburg-Prussia and Denmark-Norway. Oxenstierna helped negotiate the 1679 Saint-Germain-en-Laye, which restored most of these losses. 

When his chief minister Johan Göransson Gyllenstierna died in 1680, Charles appointed Oxenstierna President of the Court of Chancery, a position that traditionally controlled foreign policy. A contemporary observed their personalities were very different, describing Oxenstierna as 'sluggish and formal', but that both shared a passion for horses. They also shared a belief Sweden needed peace to restore its economy and society, a guiding principle followed for the 17 years. 

Oxenstierna moved Sweden away from its traditional pro-French alliance, instead following a policy of friendship with England, the Dutch Republic and the Holy Roman Empire. This culminated in the 1681 Treaty of the Hague between Sweden, the Dutch Republic and Emperor Leopold, although he ensured Sweden remained neutral in the 1688 to 1697 Nine Years War.

As President of the Court of Chancery, he was also de facto Minister of Culture, approving all publications; author and military engineer Erik Dahlbergh, (1625-1703), dedicated a number of books to him.

When Charles XI died in 1697, Oxenstierna was one of the regents during the minority of his son Charles XII of Sweden, a talented soldier of great energy and ambition. Charles launched the Great Northern War in 1700 and Oxenstierna retired from office; he died in July 1702 and was buried in Uppsala Cathedral, where his grave monument can still be seen. 
The 1911 Encyclopædia Britannica describes him as "a shrewd and subtle little man, of gentle disposition, but remarkable for his firmness and tenacity of character."

References

Sources

External links
 
 
 
 

Governors-General of Sweden
Swedish nobility
Bengt
1623 births
1702 deaths
17th-century Swedish politicians